Dang Ngoc Long is a Vietnamese concert guitarist, composer and actor. He studied classical guitar in Hochschule für Musik "Hanns Eisler" Berlin. Today he lives in Berlin and is the art director of the International Guitar Competition & Festival Berlin and director of the music school Berlin Gesundbrunnen.

Biography 
From 1985 to 1990 he completed his classical guitar studies with Inge Wilczok at the "Hanns Eisler" musical academy in Berlin. From 1990 to 1993 he received a scholarship for concert master studies. Dang Ngoc Long received a special award at the international guitar competition (1987-Esztergom-Hungary). He gave concerts in Hungary, Italy, Spain, Czech Republic, France, Austria, among others. Dang Ngoc Long was awarded the title of an honorary professor of the University of Kirgysia. He is director of the music school Berlin Gesundbrunnen. He is also art director of the International Guitar Competition & Festival Berlin.

He composed many works for guitar solo, duo, trio, and quartet: "Tay Nguyen Gebirge", Erinnerung, Prelude No. 1, Mienman, Beo dat may troi – Vietnam Folk Song, Fantasie in G-Dur, Kreislauf, Gian ma thuong, Prelude No. 4. Many pieces were chosen as test pieces for the international guitar competition: Prelude No. 1, Mienman, For Thay, Bamboo-Ber, Gian ma thương, Prelude No. 4, Morning-Mai, Beo dat may troi, "Ru con", "Rain", "The Central Highlands of Tay Nguyen".

Since 2012 he is undergoing a Special Actors Coaching by Kristiane Kupfer and worked in many movie productions under the name of "Long Dang-Ngoc".

Compositions

Filmography 

 2011: I Phone You (Cinema)
 2011: Der Kriminalist (TV-Series)   
 2012: Allein unter Nachbarn (Movie)
 2012: Jahr des Drachen (Movie)
 2013: Der Feind in meinem Leben (Movie)
 2014: Kommissarin Lucas (TV-Series)
 2014: VW Beijing (Advertisement)
 2014: Alle unter eine Tanne (Movie)
 2015: Ein starkes Team (TV-Series)
 2016: Krauses Glück (Movie)
 2017: Obst & Gemüse (Short Movie)
 2017: Die Kanzlei (TV-Series)
 2018: Blossoms in the Dark (Kurzfilm)
 2018: You are wanted 2 (Amazon-Series)
 2018: IKEA (Advertisement)
 2018: Der Spezialist (TV-Series)
 2018: Das Chinesische Licht (TV-Series)
 2018: SOKO Leipzig (TV-Series)
 2019: Krauses Umzug (TV movie)
 2019: Hausen (Sky-Series)
 2020: Morden im Norden (TV-Series)

Discography 

 CD1 – Guitar music vol.1 (1997)
 CD2 – Long plays Long (2009)
 CD3 – Long plays Long-Suite KIEU (2016)
 CD4 – Long plays Long-Faust
 CD5 – Long plays others (2020)
 CD6 – Long plays Others 2
 CD7 – Nghe em hat loi yeu (2015)
 CD8 – Loi ca toi viet (2017)
 CD9 – Tinh yeu mua dong (2017)
 CD10 – Ha noi toi oi (2018)

Publications 
 2009: Gitarrenschule 1 
 2014: Long Plays Long
 2017: Suite Kieu
 2019: Guitar Solo, Ausgewählte Gitarrensolos
 Works by Dang Ngoc Long in the  Deutschen Nationalbibliothek

External links 
 Official Website
 Internet Movie Database (IMDb)
 Belarus 2014
 Professor Dang Ngoc Long brings "Kiều" into the international world of music
 Bringing 'Ru con' to the 2014 International Guitar Competition in Germany
 Guitar Dragon in Europe

References 

http://quehuongonline.vn/nguoi-viet-o-nuoc-ngoai/nhac-si-dang-ngoc-long-nguoi-dua-thinh-gia-du-ngoan-viet-nam-qua-am-nhac-dan-toc-20200730110006239.htm
https://baoquocte.vn/giao-su-dang-ngoc-long-nguoi-dua-thinh-gia-du-ngoan-viet-nam-qua-am-nhac-dan-toc-120931.html

Composers for the classical guitar
Classical guitarists
Vietnamese composers
Living people
Year of birth missing (living people)